The 2014–15 Moldovan Cup is the 24th season of the Moldovan annual football tournament. The competition began on 23 August 2013 with the First Preliminary Round and will end with the final held in May 2014. The winner of the competition will qualify for the first qualifying round of the 2014–15 UEFA Europa League.

First Preliminary Round
Entering this round are 26 clubs from the Moldovan "B" Division. These matches took place on 23, 24 August 2014.

|}

Second Preliminary Round
The 13 winners from the previous round and 1 clubs from the Moldovan "B" Division entered this stage of the competition. These matches took place on 30 and 31 August 2014.

|}

First round
In this round enter teams from "A" Division. They will play against 7 winner teams from the second preliminary round. These matches took place on 7 September 2014.

|}

Second round
Draw was on 9 September 2014. These matches took place on 23 & 24 September 2014.

|}

Third round
These matches took place on 28 and 29 October 2014.

|}

Quarterfinals
These matches took place on 2 and 3 December 2014.

|}

Semi-finals
This round featured the four winners from the previous round. The matches were played on 29 April 2015.

|}

Final
This round featured the two winners from the previous round. The match were played on 24 May 2015.

Top goalscorers

Updated to matches played on 30 April 2015.

Hat-tricks

References

External links
2014-2015 la soccerway

Moldovan Cup seasons
Cup
Moldova